Freelandgunj is a census town in Dahod district  in the state of Gujarat, India.

Demographics
 India census, Freelandgunj had a population of 16,084. Males constitute 52% of the population and females 48%. Freelandgunj has an average literacy rate of 77%, higher than the national average of 59.5%: male literacy is 85%, and female literacy is 69%. In Freelandgunj, 12% of the population is under 6 years of age. Freelandgunj is the railway colony of dahod. It consists of people working in railway wagon workshop in dahod and other railway occupations.

References

Cities and towns in Dahod district